The Colorado Rockies are a Major League Baseball (MLB) franchise based in Denver, Colorado. They play in the National League West division. The first game of the new baseball season for a team is played on Opening Day, and being named the Opening Day starter is an honor, which is often given to the player who is expected to lead the pitching staff that season, though there are various strategic reasons why a team's best pitcher might not start on Opening Day. The Rockies have used 20 different Opening Day starting pitchers in their 28 seasons. Since the Rockies' first season in 1993, the 20 starters have a combined Opening Day record of eleven wins, nine losses (11–9), and eight no decisions. No decisions are only awarded to the starting pitcher if the game is won or lost after the starting pitcher has left the game.

Eight Rockies pitchers have started on two Opening Days: Kevin Ritz, Darryl Kile, Mike Hampton, Jason Jennings, Aaron Cook, Ubaldo Jiménez, Jorge de la Rosa, and Jon Gray. Kile has the best Opening Day record with two wins and no losses. Armando Reynoso is the only Rockies pitcher to start on Opening Day in Colorado's former home of Mile High Stadium. Rockies starting pitchers have an Opening Day record of four wins, two losses, and one no decision when at home. With the exception of one lost game at Mile High Stadium, the other games were played at Colorado's current home stadium of Coors Field. On the road for Opening Day, Colorado starting pitchers have accumulated a record of seven wins, seven losses, and seven no decisions. The Rockies have a record of two wins and three losses on Opening Day for seasons in which they would later go on to participate in post-season play.

The longest Opening Day winning streak for Rockies starting pitchers is three years, when Colorado won in 2004, 2005, and 2006, under three different pitchers, Shawn Estes, Joe Kennedy, and Jason Jennings. Rockies starters have lost twice in two consecutive years, once in 1993 and 1994, and once from 2002 to 2003.

Key

Pitchers

References 

Opening day starters
Lists of Major League Baseball Opening Day starting pitchers